The Aero-Service Puma is a Polish ultralight aircraft, designed and produced by Aero-Service Jacek Skopiński of Warsaw. The aircraft is supplied complete and ready-to-fly.

Design and development
The Puma was designed to comply with the Fédération Aéronautique Internationale microlight rules. It features a cantilever low-wing, a two-seats-in-side-by-side configuration enclosed cockpit under a bubble canopy, retractable tricycle landing gear and a single engine in tractor configuration.

The aircraft fuselage is made from welded steel tubing, with an aluminum sheet wing. Its  span wing employs a NACA 4415 airfoil at the wing root, transitioning to a NACA 4412 at the wing tip. Standard engines available are the  Rotax 912UL, the  Rotax 912ULS and the  Rotax 914 four-stroke powerplants.

The Puma was designed in 2008, with a prototype under construction in September 2011. No first flight of the design has been confirmed.

A fixed gear version, to be called the Raptor, was under preliminary development in 2010.

Specifications (Puma)

See also
Aero-Service Panda

References

External links

Puma
2010s Polish ultralight aircraft
Single-engined tractor aircraft